Costa di Mezzate is a comune in the province of Bergamo, in Lombardy, Italy. Neighbouring communes are Albano Sant'Alessandro, Bagnatica, Bolgare, Calcinate, Gorlago and Montello.

References